Kalamandalam Kshemavathy (born 1948) is a Mohiniyattam dancer from Thrissur, Kerala.  She is an alumna of the Kerala Kalamandalam. She joined the institute when she was ten. After completion of the course, she undertook advanced training in Bharata Natyam under Muthuswamy Pillai and Chitra Visweswaran, and in Kuchipudi under Vempati Chinna Satyam, but chose to remain within the Mohiniyattam tradition.

Credentials 

She was awarded the Padma Shri in 2011 for her contributions to Mohinyattam. She has also received the Sangeet Natak Akademi Award, She received the Kerala Sangeetha Nataka Akademi Award in 1975 (for Bharatanatyam) and the Kerala Sangeetha Nataka Akademi Fellowship in 2015.

Kshemavathy is known for her abhinaya and traditionalist approach to the art form.  She encourages research and believes that experimentation is inevitable, but must be explored leaving the basics of the art form untarnished. Her dance school has attracted international talents from Germany, France,  Sweden and Finland in the past. 

She has given a visual representation for about 100 poems, including those of cherrusseri and sugathakumari, "kuchelavrittam", classics like chinthavishtayaya seetha, leela etc., and even ghazals. She is a teacher with a large number of students.

Personal life 

Kshemavathy was the wife of V. K. Pavithran. She has two daughters, Eva Pavithran and Lakshmi Pavithran.

Filmography

As Actress

As Choreographer

References

External links 

Indian female classical dancers
Mohiniyattam exponents
Performers of Indian classical dance
Dancers from Kerala
1948 births
Living people
Recipients of the Padma Shri in arts
Date of birth missing (living people)
Recipients of the Sangeet Natak Akademi Award
Malayali people
Artists from Thrissur
20th-century Indian dancers
20th-century Indian women artists
Women artists from Kerala
21st-century Indian dancers
21st-century Indian women artists
Actresses in Malayalam cinema
Recipients of the Kerala Sangeetha Nataka Akademi Fellowship
Recipients of the Kerala Sangeetha Nataka Akademi Award